Kalina may refer to:

People
 Kalina people, or Caribs, an indigenous people of the northern coastal areas of South America
 Kalina language, or Carib, the language of the Kalina people
 Kalina (given name)
 Kalina (surname)
 Noah Kalina, American photographer and creator of Everyday

Places

Poland
 Kalina, Gniezno County in Greater Poland Voivodeship (west-central Poland)
 Kalina, Konin County in Greater Poland Voivodeship (west-central Poland)
 Kalina, Masovian Voivodeship (east-central Poland)
 Kalina, Silesian Voivodeship (south Poland)
 Kalina, Warmian-Masurian Voivodeship (north Poland)
 Kalina, West Pomeranian Voivodeship (north-west Poland)
 Kalina Mała, Poland

Bulgaria
 Kalina, Dobrich Province
 Kalina, Vidin Province
 Kalina, Traditional Name

Other
 Kalina, a geographical location in Mumbai
 Kalina, Estonia, village in Mäetaguse Parish, Ida-Viru County, Estonia
 Kalina, the former name of Gombe in the Democratic Republic of Congo

Other uses
 Kalina (Vidhan Sabha constituency), Maharashtra, India
 Kalina (whale), the first orca to be born and raised successfully in captivity
 Kalina cycle, a process thorough which thermodynamic energy is converted to mechanical power
 Lada Kalina, a Russian car
 Project Kalina, a Russian proposed fifth-generation submarine
 SPG Kalina, a Polish tracked vehicle

See also
Kalyna Country, an ecomusem in Canada, whose name comes from the Slavic word Калина (Kalyna or Kalina) meaning high-bush cranberry

Language and nationality disambiguation pages